The eighth season of the long-running food reality television series Man v. Food premiered on July 2, 2019 at 10PM ET on the Cooking Channel. It is the fourth season of the show to be hosted by actor and food enthusiast Casey Webb, who took over hosting duties upon the show's revival in 2017. This is also the show's first season to premiere on the Cooking Channel after the show was moved from its original home, the Travel Channel.

Like each previous season, Webb visits various local eateries in different cities before taking on a pre-existing food challenge in each city.

After the airing of the November 26, 2019 episode in San Francisco, the show took a 3-month break before resuming on February 25, 2020 in Mystic, Connecticut. This season ultimately ended with 19 wins for "Man" and 13 wins for "Food".

Episodes

References

External links
 Man v. Food | Cooking Channel

2019 American television seasons
Man v. Food